Boston, the capital of the U.S. state of Massachusetts and the largest city in New England, is home to 451 completed high-rises, 37 of which stand taller than . The majority of the city's skyscrapers and high-rises are clustered in the Financial District and Back Bay neighborhoods. The tallest structure in Boston is the 60-story 200 Clarendon, better known to locals as the John Hancock Tower, which rises  in the Back Bay district. It is also the tallest building in New England and the 80th-tallest building in the United States. At the time of the Prudential Tower's completion in 1964, it stood as the tallest building in North America outside of New York City.

Boston's history of skyscrapers began with the completion in 1893 of the 13-story Ames Building, which is considered the city's first high-rise. Boston went through a major building boom in the 1960s and 1970s, resulting in the construction of over 20 skyscrapers, including 200 Clarendon and the Prudential Tower. The city is the site of 25 skyscrapers that rise at least  in height, more than any other city in New England. , the skyline of Boston is ranked 10th in the United States and 79th in the world with 57 buildings rising at least  in height.

Since August 2017, several major development projects have dramatically altered the city's skyline, including the Millennium Tower, Avalon North Station, Four Seasons Hotel & Private Residences, One Dalton Street, The Hub on Causeway, and Bulfinch Crossing. In addition, there has been a continuous stream of proposals to construct skyscrapers that would rank among the tallest in the city if completed. Overall, there were 64 high-rise buildings under construction or proposed for construction in Boston.

Tallest buildings
  
Boston skyscrapers that stand at least 400 feet (122 m) tall, based on standard height measurements, including spires and other architectural details, but not including antenna masts, are listed below. (The letter (T) following a rank indicates the same height between two or more buildings. The "Year" column indicates the year when a building was completed.)

Tallest buildings by pinnacle height
Boston skyscrapers based on their pinnacle height, which includes radio masts and antennas, are listed below. As architectural features and spires can be regarded as subjective, some skyscraper enthusiasts prefer this method of measurement. Standard architectural height measurement, which excludes antennas in building height, is included for comparative purposes.

Under construction

Tallest approved or proposed

* Table entries with dashes (—) indicate that information regarding building dates of completion has not yet been released.

Tallest by neighborhood

Timeline of tallest buildings
For most of Boston's earlier years, the tallest buildings in the city were churches with their steeples. The first skyscraper in the city is generally considered the Ames Building, completed in 1893. However, since the 13-story building did not surpass the steeple of the Church of the Covenant, it never became a city record holder. The first skyscraper to have the distinction of being Boston's tallest building was the Custom House Tower, completed in 1915.

See also 
 List of tallest buildings in Massachusetts, exclusive of Boston
 List of tallest buildings and structures in Cambridge, Massachusetts
 List of tallest buildings in Springfield, Massachusetts
 List of tallest buildings in Worcester, Massachusetts
 Trans National Place

References
 General
 

 Specific

Further reading

External links

 Boston Skyscrapers and Construction on archBOSTON
 Diagram of Boston skyscrapers on SkyscraperPage
 Boston structures on Structurae
 City of Boston building and land value assessment website

 
Tallest buildings, Boston
Boston
Boston